Jonathan Solomons (born 16 January 1976 in Cape Town) is a South African football (soccer) winger for the Vodacom League club Milano United. He made his professional debut in 1994 at Hellenic.

Solomons spent the 2006–07 season struggling with injury at Bloemfontein Celtic and started in only three cup games while there.

References

1976 births
Living people
Sportspeople from Cape Town
South African soccer players
Association football wingers
Bloemfontein Celtic F.C. players